Julián Martínez, also known as Pocano (1879–1943), was a San Ildefonso Pueblo potter, painter, and the patriarch of a family of Native American ceramic artists in the United States.

Background
Martínez was born in 1879 in San Ildefonso Pueblo, New Mexico. His name, Pocano, means "Coming of the Spirits" in Tewa. He worked as a farmer, general laborer, and janitor, in addition to being an artist. He was elected governor of San Ildefonso.

Martínez married matriarch potter Maria Martinez, and together they had a son Popovi Da, who also potter. Maria is considered the preeminent creator of San Ildefonso blackware pottery; however Julian contributed to her accomplishments. Their son Popovi Da continued innovating Pueblo ceramic arts; his work has been widely exhibited and collected.

Martinez died on March 6, 1943, in San Ildefonso Pueblo.

Work
The Martinez family was instrumental in reviving the San Ildefonso and creating the San Ildefonso black-on-black, matte-on-shiny pottery technique. The Martínez family is credited for inventing a technique that would allow for areas of the pottery to have a matte finish and other areas to be a glossy jet black.

Martínez, with help from anthropologist, Edgar Lee Hewett researched historical designs and reproduced them on the pottery, later modifying classical Pueblo designs to create his own.

Martínez was also an easel painter. He painted scenes of Pueblo rituals as well as abstract designs with colored pencil and watercolor, and featured Western figurative types against blank backgrounds. He painted murals at the former Santa Fe Indian School in Santa Fe, New Mexico and  Mesa Verde National Park in Colorado.

Martínez was part of an art movement called the San Ildefonso Self-Taught Group, which included such noted artists as Alfonso Roybal, Tonita Peña, Abel Sanchez (Oqwa Pi), Crecencio Martinez, and Encarnación Peña.

Public collections
The artwork of Maria and Julian Martinez can be found in the following public collections.

American Museum of Natural History, New York
Amerind Foundation, Dragoon, Arizona
Amon Carter Museum of Art, Fort Worth, Texas
Arizona State Museum, Tucson
Cincinnati Art Museum, Ohio
Cleveland Museum of Fine Arts, Ohio
Columbus Gallery of Fine Arts, Ohio
Dartmouth College, Hanover, New Hampshire
Denver Art Museum, Colorado
Fred Jones Jr. Museum of Art, Norman, Oklahoma
Gilcrease Museum, Tulsa, Oklahoma
Joslyn Art Museum, Omaha, Nebraska
Marion Koogler McNay Art Museum, San Antonio, Texas
Millicent Rogers Museum, Taos, New Mexico
Montclair Art Museum, Montclair, New Jersey
Minneapolis Institute of Arts, Minnesota
Museum of New Mexico, Santa Fe
Museum of Northern Arizona, Katherine Harvey Collection, Flagstaff
National Museum of the American Indian, George Gustav Heye Center, New York 
National Museum of the American Indian, Washington, D.C.
Newark Museum, Newark, NJ
Owensboro Museum of Fine Arts, Owensboro, Kentucky
Philbrook Museum of Art, Tulsa, Oklahoma
Riverside Museum, New York
School for Advanced Research, Santa Fe, New Mexico
Smithsonian Museum of American Art, Washington, D.C.
Southwest Museum of the American Indian, Los Angeles
University of Pennsylvania Museum, Philadelphia
Wheelwright Museum of the American Indian, Santa Fe, New Mexico

See also
 List of Native American artists
 Native American pottery
 Black-on-black ware

References

Notes
Lester, Patrick D. The Biographical Directory of Native American Painters. Tulsa, OK: SIR Publications, 1995. .
 Crawford, Virginia. "American Indian Painting." The Bulletin of the Cleveland Museum of Art 69, no. 1 (1982): 3-17.

External links
Julian Martinez art, National Museum of the American Indian
Julian Martinez art, Smithsonian American Art Museum

1879 births
1943 deaths
Artists from New Mexico
Native American painters
Native American potters
Painters from New Mexico
Pueblo artists
20th-century American painters
American male painters
People from San Ildefonso Pueblo, New Mexico
20th-century ceramists
Native American male artists
20th-century Native Americans
20th-century American male artists